The Commuter Cars Tango is a prototype ultra-narrow electric sports car designed and built by Commuter Cars, an electric car company based out of Spokane, Washington.

History
Commuter Cars was founded in Spokane, Washington, by Rick Woodbury and his son Bryan Woodbury in 1998.  Bryan Woodbury says that his father had come up with the original idea sometime in the early 1980s. He had learned that 106 million people in the United States were driving to work alone. He came up with the idea for a single-seat electric car. Starting in the 1980s, Woodbury started researching hydrogen power, which lead to fuel cells.  The relatively light weight of the fuel cells led to his idea of a stable, narrow vehicle with a low center of gravity.  While waiting for fuel cell technology to catch up, he eventually settled on a design for the car to have individual electric motors for each wheel. In his spare time, he worked on building his first car. In 1998, he sold his yacht to fund the company. He settled on a plan to use parts that were already produced, instead of producing every part for the vehicles. Commuter Cars used various parts manufactured for other, more common cars.   Among those parts was a safety cage made to NASCAR specifications.

Production of the first of their line of ultra-narrow electric sports cars began with the Tango T600. The company designed a small electric car.  They stated that production of the first version, at a rate of about 100 cars per year, was set to begin in late 2005. Actor George Clooney took delivery of the first Tango kit on August 9, 2005, which was a major milestone for the company. Clooney appeared in the press with the car, explaining its features and promoting it. Difficulties with their UK manufacturer forced Commuter Cars to take over manufacturing themselves; for this reason the second vehicle did not ship until February 11, 2008. It was completely assembled in Spokane, Washington. The second car eventually found its way into the second-floor office of Google CEO Eric Schmidt as part of an April Fools' Day joke. 

By 2008, Commuter Cars had only produced 10 cars, which sold for an average of $121,000 each. The first production car was sold to actor George Clooney who took delivery on August 9, 2005. The company generated a significant amount of media interest with the sale to Clooney. However, that initial media attention did not lead to a production deal. 

In 2010, the company entered the Progressive Insurance Automotive X Prize in the "Alternative" category.  The vehicle entered was a Tango T600 owned by Google founder Sergey Brin, borrowed back for the competition.  After passing many of the performance tests with ease, the car failed to complete the 100 mile durability run (one of the complicated set of requirements for the prize) and was eliminated from the competition. The company did not get a production deal with a manufacturer, and by 2014, fewer than 20 cars had been built in the United States.

Throughout the company's history, Commuter Cars has had limited financial resources. Whenever the company did generate a profit, they reinvested the money in research and production capacity for their future vehicles.  When the company had sufficient funding during 2007, it employed eight workers and was able to manufacture one car each month.

By 2018, Car and Driver magazine gave the company a 1.1 out of 10 chance of survival.

Overview
The Tango is thinner than some motorcycles and may be small enough to legally ride side-by-side with other small vehicles in traffic lanes in some jurisdictions. Capable of seating two passengers in a tandem seating arrangement, it only takes up one-quarter of a standard parking space and is able to park sideways. One prototype vehicle has been produced by the company and was shipped to Prodrive in the United Kingdom in January 2005, where the design was refined for production models.

Commuter Cars states that the Tango's heavy battery pack and low ground-clearance combine to give it a center-of-mass  from the ground, allowing for stable handling. About two-thirds of the  curb weight in the prototype is taken up by the batteries, twin motors, and controller, mounted low in the frame. Propulsion is provided by two electric motors. To extend its range, an optional generator cart can be attached to the Tango.

Recharge
Commuter Cars notes that a dryer outlet will give most of the charge in an hour, or a full charge in less than 3 hours. With a 120-volt outlet, the batteries can fully charge overnight. With a 200-amp off-board charger, the Tango can be charged to 80% in about 10 minutes.

Specifications
Width: 
Length: 
Weight:  (claimed)
Batteries: 12 V * 19 Hawker Odysseys or 25 Exide Orbital XCDs or Optima Yellow Tops. Lithium-ion battery options available
Nominal voltage: 228 V with 19 Hawkers, 300 V with 25 batteries, 250 V with lithium-ion batteries.
Charging: 50 A Manzanita Micro on-board charger with Avcon conductive coupling. 200 A off-board charger under development.
Motors: 2 Advanced DC Motors DC FB1-4001 9", one driving each rear wheel with claimed  of combined torque at low rpms. 8,000 rpm redline. or 4 motors, one for each wheel, lithium batteries.

Performance (claimed)
: 3.2 seconds
: 12.25 seconds @ 
Top speed: 150 mph (240 km/h)
Range: 40–60 miles (96–128 km) with lead-acid batteries.  with lithium-ion batteries.
805 hp claimed.

See also

 William Garrison – studied concept of narrow vehicles

Notes

References

External links

 

Microcars
Cars of the United States
Production electric cars